East Kildonan is a primarily residential community in northeast Winnipeg, Manitoba, Canada. Commonly known by its initials EK, the suburb has a population of approximately 35,800 as of the 2016 Census.

It is mainly a working- and middle-class community, though there are poorer pockets south of Munroe Avenue and more affluent areas along the Red River and west of Henderson Highway, East Kildonan's major thoroughfare. There is a small industrial area located between Watt Street and the CPR tracks.

East Kildonan is considered part of the western half of the River East community area. It is made up of the neighbourhoods of Munroe, Morse Place, Rossmere, and Fraser's Grove.

History 

The name "Kildonan" originates from the Parish of Kildonan which was created in 1817. At the time, parishes formed both a land use system and a system of local government. The Parish of Kildonan formed part of the Red River Colony, and was named for the Strath of Kildonan on the Sutherland estate in Scotland where many of the settlers came from.

The Municipality of Kildonan was established in 1876. From 1876 to 1914 the Rural Municipality of Kildonan included a large area on both sides of the Red River, just north of the original City of Winnipeg. The area remained primarily agricultural until the beginning of the 20th century. It was a centre for market gardening to serve the needs of nearby Winnipeg. In 1903 streetcar service was initiated in the area and this began the area's development as a residential suburb of Winnipeg. In 1906 the more heavily developed southern area of the municipality, known as Elmwood, joined with the City of Winnipeg.

In 1914 Kildonan was divided in two: East and West Kildonan, with the Red River as the boundary. Subsequently, in 1925, the areas north of Oakland Avenue separated to form the Municipality of North Kildonan. East Kildonan developed rapidly after World War II, the population grew from 8,439 in 1941 to 30,150 in 1971.

With a population of 20,000, the area was finally incorporated as the City of East Kildonan on 1 July 1957 (Dominion Day), making it the fourth city in the area—following Winnipeg, St. Boniface and St. James—and the sixth largest city in Manitoba. East Kildonan initially wanted its title to be the City of Kildonan, but Old, North, and West Kildonan all vehemently objected.

East Kildonan saw a housing boom in the mid 1950s, leading to the development of roads, sewers, and schools. In 1959, the opening of the Disraeli Freeway further accelerated the growth of the area.

In 1972, East Kildonan, along with the old City of Winnipeg and eleven other municipalities in the Greater Winnipeg Area, amalgamated to form the City of Winnipeg. It was the only suburban municipality to be in favour of the "unicity" scheme.

Geography 

Its major thoroughfare is Henderson Highway, located on the west. The area also houses Concordia Hospital.

Neighbourhoods 
East Kildonan is considered part of the western half of the River East community area. It is made up of such neighbourhoods as Munroe, Morse Place, Rossmere, and Fraser's Grove.

Crime rates

The table below shows the crime rates of various crimes in each of the East Kildonan neighborhoods. The crime data spans 5 years from the year 2017 to the year 2021. The rates are crimes per 100,000 residents per year.

Notable people
 Matt Wiebe (1979–), politician and member of the Legislative Assembly of Manitoba

References

External links 
East Kildonan History: A to C, North East Winnipeg Historical Society
Miles MacDonell Collegiate - East Kildonan History
 East Kildonan Police 1914-1974, Pre-Amalgamation Police Department Histories (City of Winnipeg)

East_Kildonan
1972 establishments in Manitoba
Former municipalities now in Winnipeg
Populated places established in 1972
Neighbourhoods in Winnipeg